Uncharted is the sixth studio album by American music group The Piano Guys. It was released on October 28, 2016, by Portrait Records. The album reached number 15 on the US Billboard 200, making it their second highest charting album to date.

The album features their first vocal single, "(It's Gonna be) Okay". The songs "The Jungle Book/ Sarabande", filmed at Chichén Itzá, and "Indiana Jones and the Arabian Nights", filmed at Petra, are the continuation of their "Wonders of the World" quest.

The deluxe version of Uncharted comes with a DVD featuring 9 music videos and behind the scenes content.

Track listing

Notes

Charts

Weekly charts

Year-end charts

References 

The Piano Guys albums
2016 classical albums